Durga Raj Dhamala, known as Rishi Dhamala, is a Nepalese journalist and the founder of a Nepali journalist association, Reporter's Club Nepal. Dhamala works for several other media outlets in Nepal. He hosts the Nepal Bani Network's Bani Bahas and writes features and nonsense articles in newspapers, and also edits his own online newsportals.

Controversies 
On 3 February 2009, Dhamala was arrested by the Nepalese police for links with a terrorist outfit, Ranvir Sena. He was released on 13 April by the Appellate Court Patan.

References 

Living people
Nepalese journalists
People from Dhading District
Nepalese political journalists
Year of birth missing (living people)
Khas people